HMS C31 was one of 38 C-class submarines built for the Royal Navy in the first decade of the 20th century. She struck a mine in 1915 and sank with the loss of all hands.

Design and description
The C-class boats of the 1907–08 and subsequent Naval Programmes were modified to improve their speed, both above and below the surface. They displaced  on the surface and  submerged. The C-class submarines had a crew of two officers and fourteen ratings.

For surface running, the boats were powered by a single 12-cylinder  Vickers petrol engine that drove one propeller shaft. When submerged the propeller was driven by a  electric motor. They could reach  on the surface and  underwater.

The boats were armed with two 18-inch (45 cm) torpedo tubes in the bow. They could carry a pair of reload torpedoes, but generally did not as they would have to remove an equal weight of fuel in compensation.

Construction and career
HMS C31 was built by Vickers, Barrow. She was laid down on 7 January 1909 and was commissioned on 19 November 1909. The boat was sunk by a mine off the Belgian coast on 4 January 1915 whilst patrolling off Zeebrugge. There were no survivors.

Notes

External links
HMS C31 Roll of Honour
'Submarine losses 1904 to present day' - Royal Navy Submarine Museum

References
 
 
 
 

 

British C-class submarines
Royal Navy ship names
Ships built in Barrow-in-Furness
World War I shipwrecks in the North Sea
Lost submarines of the United Kingdom
Maritime incidents in 1915
Ships sunk by mines
1909 ships